"Bursting Through" is a song by New Zealand artist Bic Runga, released in September 1996 as the first single from her debut studio album, Drive (1997).

In 2001, the song was voted 51st best New Zealand song of all time by members of APRA.

Track listing
"Bursting Through"
"Making a Scene"
"Bursting Through" (acoustic mix)

Chart positions

References

External links
Bic's official website

1996 singles
APRA Award winners
Bic Runga songs
1996 songs
Epic Records singles
Songs written by Bic Runga